Tuhovec  is located in Varaždin, Croatia. It is connected by the D2 highway. Its main road (simply named, Tuhovec) is approximately 2.39 km (1.8 miles) long

References

Populated places in Varaždin County